Leonard Harbin (30 April 1915 – 19 May 2013) was an English cricketer. Born in Trinidad, in the West Indies, he played for Gloucestershire between 1948 and 1951.

References

External links

1915 births
2013 deaths
Trinidad and Tobago emigrants to the United Kingdom
Gloucestershire cricketers
Trinidad and Tobago cricketers